Eugen Studach (18 November 1907 – ?) was a Swiss rower. He competed at the 1936 Summer Olympics in Berlin with the men's double sculls where they were eliminated in the semi-finals.

References

1907 births
Year of death missing
Swiss male rowers
Olympic rowers of Switzerland
Rowers at the 1936 Summer Olympics
European Rowing Championships medalists